Verpete is a settlement in the Municipality of Vojnik in eastern Slovenia. It lies on the main road from Vojnik towards Slovenske Konjice, just north of Frankolovo. The area is part of the traditional region of Styria. It is now included with the rest of the municipality in the Savinja Statistical Region.

References

External links
Verpete at Geopedia

Populated places in the Municipality of Vojnik